Ferney is an unincorporated community and census-designated place in Brown County, South Dakota, United States. As of the 2020 census it had a population of 42. Ferney has been assigned the ZIP code of 57439.

Demographics

History
Ferney was laid out and platted in 1886 by W. H. Ferney, and named for him. According to another tradition, the name is a transfer from Ferney, France. A post office was established at Ferney in 1887, and remained in operation until it was discontinued in 1984.

References

Census-designated places in South Dakota
Unincorporated communities in Brown County, South Dakota
Unincorporated communities in South Dakota
Aberdeen, South Dakota micropolitan area